Ann Burnstein is an American bridge player.

Bridge accomplishments

Wins

 North American Bridge Championships (11)
 Chicago Mixed Board-a-Match (2) 1952, 1953 
 Rockwell Mixed Pairs (2) 1946, 1952 
 Smith Life Master Women's Pairs (1) 1963 
 Wagar Women's Knockout Teams (3) 1951, 1962, 1979 
 Whitehead Women's Pairs (1) 1979

Runners-up

 North American Bridge Championships (3)
 Smith Life Master Women's Pairs (1) 1962 
 Wagar Women's Knockout Teams (1) 1955 
 Whitehead Women's Pairs (1) 1946

Notes

American contract bridge players